Jae-ho is a Korean masculine given name. Its meaning differs based on the hanja used to write each syllable of the name. There are 20 hanja with the reading "jae" and 49 hanja with the reading "ho" on the South Korean government's official list of hanja which may be used in given names.

People with this name include:
Song Jae-ho (born 1937), South Korean actor
Kim Jae-ho (born 1963), South Korean judge
Hong Jae-ho (born 1968), South Korean rower
Chun Jae-ho (born 1979), South Korean footballer
Choiza (born Choi Jae-ho, 1980), South Korean rapper
Kim Jae-ho (baseball) (born 1985), South Korean baseball player
Jang Jae-ho (born 1986), South Korean professional gamer
, South Korean composer, founder of Sweetune

See also
List of Korean given names

References

Korean masculine given names